Vyacheslav Kurginyan (born 22 December 1986) is a Russian short track speed skater. He competed in three events at the 2006 Winter Olympics.

External links
Vyacheslav Kurginyan at ISU

References

1986 births
Living people
Russian male short track speed skaters
Olympic short track speed skaters of Russia
Short track speed skaters at the 2006 Winter Olympics
Sportspeople from Ufa